Torodora pentagona is a moth in the family Lecithoceridae. It was described by Kyu-Tek Park in 2002. It is found in Cambodia and Thailand.

The wingspan is about 14 mm. The forewings are similar to those of Torodora aritai in colour pattern. The ground colour is brown with a small yellowish-white patch at four-fifths of the costa and a dark brown spot at the end of the cell, and another small spot at the middle. The hindwings are grey.

Etymology
The species name refers to the shape of the uncus and is derived from Greek pente (meaning five).

References

Moths described in 2002
Torodora